Anne Constance Smedley, married name Constance Armfield, (20 June 1876 – 9 March 1941) was a British artist, playwright, author and founder of the International Association of Lyceum Clubs.

Life
Smedley was born in Handsworth near Birmingham in 1876. Her well-off and educated parents allowed their daughter to become a student at the Birmingham School of Art. Smedley lived with disabilities that are thought to have come from childhood polio. Despite some artistic success her interest turned to writing plays.

In 1909 she married the artist Maxwell Armfield. She was the first cousin of his friend and fellow artist William Smedley-Aston. Like many with connections to the Arts and Crafts Movement in Birmingham they settled in the Cotswolds. In the 1911 census, they both appear as resident in Minchinhampton (Gloucestershire). The couple became close collaborators: working together to combine design, illustration, text and theatre. Armfield's wife also influenced him to become a pacifist and Christian Scientist.

She was a prolific author and had been embarrassed by being a female member of her writers' club. She approached the club with the support of Christina Gowans Whyte, Elsa Hahn, Violet Alcock, and an American, Jessie Trimble. She proposed to change the club but her offer was refused. She realised that women needed a respectable club that offered good hospitality. Aspiring career women needed a place where they could entertain without having to invite people to their homes. She formed a committee and despite writing to 60 writers they found only two extra supporters. Smedley's father offered to fund a clubhouse if she could find a 1,000 members.

Jessie Trimble proposed that the new club be called the Lyceum Club and the new committee arranged for Smedley to meet Lady Frances Balfour. By now the committee had decided to extend their net for new members from writers to professional women and even the daughters or wives of prominent men. Balfour agreed to lead the new club and served as chair for 15 years.

She placed an advert in the "English Women's Yearbook". Smedley became the founder of the International Association of Lyceum Clubs. The clubhouse was at 128 Piccadilly where there was an art gallery and here the club offered not only a Gentleman's Club for women but also advice for members' careers and an introduction to other clubs that grew around the world.

From 1915 the couple spent seven years in the United States.

Smedley died in West Wycombe, and was buried in the churchyard of St Lawrence.

Legacy
There is a painting of her by her husband which was made in 1906.

In 2010 Stroud Theatre players performed a play based on the life of Smedley titled "The Amazing and Preposterous Constance Smedley" in Cheltenham.

Works

References

External links 

 
 Anne Constance Smedley Armfield (1875 -1941)—Service of Commemoration mass, 20 May 2017 at St Lawrence's Church, West Wycombe

1876 births
1941 deaths
People from Handsworth, West Midlands
British dramatists and playwrights
British women writers
Alumni of the Birmingham School of Art